The United States U-17 men's national soccer team is controlled by the United States Soccer Federation. The highest level of competition in which the team may compete is in the FIFA U-17 World Cup, which is held every two years.

History
 Champions   Runners-up   Third place   Fourth place

FIFA U-17 World Cup record

CONCACAF U-17 Championship record

Results and schedule

The following is a list of match results from the previous 12 months, as well as any future matches that have been scheduled.

Legend

2023

Players

Current squad
20 players were called up for the 2023 CONCACAF U-17 Championship February 11–26, 2023.

Caps and goals are current as of February 26, 2023, after match against .

Recent call-ups
The following players have been called up in the past 12 months:

 May 2022 UEFA Developmental Tournament

The following players have been called up in the past 12 months:
 : Preliminary squad
INJ = Injured
 Friendlies vs. Argentina and Uruguay on March 15 and 18, 2022, respectively

Honors
FIFA U-17 World Cup
 Fourth Place: 1999
 CONCACAF U-17 Championship
 Winners: 1983, 1992, 2011
 Runners-up: 1987, 1988, 1991, 1994, 1996, 2017, 2019, 2023

See also
 IMG Soccer Academy
 United States men's national soccer team
 United States men's national under-20 soccer team
 United States men's national under-23 soccer team

References

External links
 Official U-17 MNT at U.S. Soccer

North American national under-17 association football teams
Youth soccer in the United States
Soc
U17
U17